Samorządki  is a village in the administrative district of Gmina Górzno, within Garwolin County, Masovian Voivodeship, in east-central Poland. From 1975 to 1998, it was part of the Siedlce Voivodeship.

References

Villages in Garwolin County